Kostelić is a surname and it may refer to:

Ante Kostelić (b. 1938), Croatian handballer and handball and alpine skiing coach
Ivica Kostelić (b. 1979), Croatian alpine skier
Janica Kostelić (b. 1982), Croatian alpine skier

See also
 Kostel

Croatian surnames